The National Museum of Taiwan History (NMTH) is a museum in Annan District, Tainan, Taiwan, covering the history of the island nation of Taiwan and its associated islands.

History 
The museum was originally planned to be opened in 2008, but it was instead opened in 2011 after 12 years of preparation.

Exhibitions 
The museum contains 60,000 artifacts spanning the Aboriginal, Dutch, Spanish, Chinese, British, and Japanese influences on Taiwan.

See also 
 List of museums in Taiwan

References

External links 

  
 

2011 establishments in Taiwan
History museums in Taiwan
Museums established in 2011
Museums in Tainan
Taiwan History